The Molniya-1 is a six-seater utility aircraft designed and built in Russia during the 1990s.

Design and development
The Molniya-1 six-seat aircraft is a three surface design with a forward balanced canard surface and a square section fuselage with a Vedeneyev M14P nine cylinder radial engine in the rear. Twin booms carry fins with balanced and trim tabbed rudders and a high set tailplane, similarly tabbed and balanced.

It was intended to cover a wide range of tasks including touring, cargo/mail carrying, business flights, aerial photography, patrol and air ambulance services. The three-surface configuration was intended to provide improved safety and fuel efficiency over conventional types, with the rear-mounted engine lowering cabin noise and vibration. It flew for the first time on 18 December 1992.

A Westernised version with a  Continental TSIO-550-B flat six engine and another, the Moliniya-3 with an Allison 250 turboprop, were proposed.  More broadly, the company were considering a number of larger types based on the three surface configuration.

Operational history
In 1993 the design received a gold medal at the Eureka-93 World Inventors, Scientific Research and Know-How Salon in Brussels. It was demonstrated at the Le Bourget aero show in 1995. Only two Moliniyas had been built by about 2000.

Specifications (Molniya-1)

References

Three-surface aircraft